Dwyer is an Irish surname which is a slightly anglicised variation of O'Dwyer. It is said that people with the  surname Dwyer and who come from Ireland all come from the same clan.

Surname

Alan Dwyer (born 1952), English association footballer
Alice Dwyer (born 1988), German actress
Allys Dwyer, American actress and educator
Angela Dwyer, Australian social scientist and academic
Anthony Dwyer (born 1970), Australian rules footballer
Audrey Dwyer, Canadian actor and playwright
Benjamin Dwyer (born 1965), Irish classical guitarist and composer
Bernard Dwyer (born 1967), English rugby league footballer
Bernard J. Dwyer (1921–1998), American politician 
Bil Dwyer (1907-1987), American cartoonist and humorist
Bil Dwyer (born 1962), American comedian and game-show host
Bill Dwyer (mobster) (1883–1946), American gangster and bootlegger
Bob Dwyer (born 1940), Australian rugby union coach
Bridget Dwyer (born 1980), American golfer
Chappie Dwyer (1894–1975), Australian cricketer
Chris Dwyer (born 1988), American baseball player
Dermod Dwyer, Irish chief executive
Dom Dwyer, English-born American association football (soccer) player
Dominic Dwyer, Australian microbiologist and Clinical Professor of Medicine
Don H. Dwyer Jr. (born 1958), American politician 
Doriot Anthony Dwyer (1922–2020), American flautist
E. B. Dwyer (1876–1912), Australian cricketer 
Edward Dwyer (1895–1916), English recipient of the Victoria Cross
Florence P. Dwyer (1902–1976), American politician
Francis Patrick Dwyer (1910–1962), Australian chemist
Frank Dwyer (1868–1943), American baseball player
George Dwyer (1908–1987), English Roman Catholic archbishop
Gordie Dwyer (born 1978), Canadian ice hockey player
Hilary Dwyer (1945–2020), English actress
Jack Dwyer (1927–1997), American football player
James Dwyer (politician) (1881–1932), Irish politician
James J. Dwyer, American politician
Jamie Dwyer (born 1979),  Australian field hockey player
Jeremy Dwyer (born 1947), Mayor of Hastings, New Zealand
Jim Dwyer (baseball) (born 1950), American baseball player
Jim Dwyer (journalist) (1957–2020), American journalist
John Dwyer (Australian judge) (1879–1966), Australian politician
John Dwyer (medicine) (born 1939), Australian professor of Medicine and public health advocate 
John Dwyer (musician), American musician 
John Dwyer (soldier) (1890–1962), Australian recipient of the Victoria Cross
John M. Dwyer (1935–2018), American set decorator
Jonathan Dwyer (born 1989), American football player
Sir Joe Dwyer (1939–2021), British civil engineer and businessman
Joseph Patrick Dwyer (1976–2008), American soldier
Joseph Dwyer (physicist) (born 1963), American physicist
Karyn Dwyer (1975–2018), Canadian actress
Kate Dwyer (1861–1949), Australian educator, suffragist, and labour activist
Kevin Dwyer (disambiguation), multiple people
Kieron Dwyer (born 1967), American comic book artist and penciller
Larry Dwyer (1884–1964), Australian rugby union player 
Laurie Dwyer (1938–2016), Australian rules footballer
Leslie Dwyer (1906–1986), English actor 
Marc Dwyer (born 1987), Australian radio presenter and actor
Mark Dwyer (born 1964), Australian rules footballer 
Martin Dwyer (born 1975), English jockey
Mary Alice Dwyer-Dobbin, American television producer
Matthew Dwyer (born 1959), Irish cricketer
Michael Dwyer (1772–1825), Irish soldier
Michael Dwyer (journalist) (1951–2010), Irish journalist and film critic
Michael Dwyer (Canadian politician) (1879–1953), Canadian politician
Michael F. Dwyer (1847–1906), American racehorse owner
Michael Martin Dwyer (1984–2009), Irish security guard
Michael Middleton Dwyer, American architect 
Mick Dwyer (born 1968), Australian rules footballer 
Mike Dwyer (ice hockey) (born 1957), Canadian ice hockey player
Nate Dwyer (born 1978), American football player
Noel Dwyer (1934–1993), Irish footballer
PK Dwyer (born 1992), American musician
Pat Dwyer (hurler), Irish hurler
Patrick Dwyer (sprinter) (born 1977), Australian sprinter
Patrick Dwyer (ice hockey) (born 1983), American ice hockey player
Penny Dwyer (1953–2003), British comedy writer and performer
Peter Dwyer, Australian anthropologist
Phil Dwyer (1953–2021), Welsh footballer
Phil Dwyer (musician) (born 1965), Canadian musician
Philip J. Dwyer (1844–1917), American racehorse owner
R. Budd Dwyer (1939–1987), American politician
Robert Joseph Dwyer (1908–1976), American Roman Catholic archbishop
Ross T. Dwyer (1919–2001), American general
Simon Dwyer (born 1989), Australian rugby league footballer 
Séamus Dwyer (1882–1922), Irish politician
Terri Dwyer (born 1973), English actress
Tommy Dwyer (hurler), Irish hurler
Ubi Dwyer (1933–2001), Irish anarchist
Virginia Dwyer, American actress
Walter Dwyer (1875–1950), Australian politician and judge
Wayne Dwyer, New Zealand rugby league player 
William Dwyer (Irish politician) (1887–1951), Irish politician
William Gerard Dwyer (born 1947), American mathematician
William Lee Dwyer (1929–2002), American judge

Hyphenated
Mary Alice Dwyer-Dobbin, American television producer
Edmund Dwyer-Gray (1870–1945), Australian politician

Given name
Robert Dwyer Joyce
Ada Dwyer Russell

See also
Dwyer (disambiguation)
O'Dwyer (surname)
Dwyre